Judges who served on the Industrial Relations Court of Australia are:

References

Industrial Relations Court of Australia